Lake Krušćica is an artificial lake located in Kosinj, Lika, Croatia. It is administratively divided between the municipalities of Gospić and Perušić of the Lika-Senj County.

Lake Krušćica was created by damming the Lika River.

See also

References

Lakes of Croatia
Landforms of Lika-Senj County